The Sea Dogs were a group of English privateers authorised by Queen Elizabeth I to raid England's enemies, whether they were formally at with war with them or not. Active from 1560 onwards until Elizabeth's death in 1603, the Sea Dogs primarily attacked Spanish targets, both on land and on sea, particularly during the Anglo-Spanish War. Members of the Sea Dogs, including Sir John Hawkins and Sir Francis Drake, also engaged in illicit slave trading with Spanish colonies in the Americas.

Overview 

The "Sea Dogs" was an informal name bestowed upon English privateers who were authorised by Queen Elizabeth I to raid England's enemies, even during times of peace. Carrying letters of marque issued by the English Crown, the Sea Dogs frequently attacked both enemy shipping at sea and enemy outposts on land. The issuing of letters of marque was originally done to compensate for the numerical inferiority of the Tudor navy in comparison to its Spanish counterpart; as England lacked a standing navy which was powerful enough to challenge the Spanish Navy head on, the Sea Dogs served as a way to attack Spanish ships during times of peace. Once Elizabeth died in 1603, one year prior to the conclusion of the Anglo-Spanish War, many former Sea Dogs sought employment in the Barbary States, becoming corsairs and attacking European merchant shipping.

Notable Sea Dogs

Sir Francis Drake 

Sir Francis Drake was one of the most successful Sea Dogs of all time. As captain of Golden Hind, he served in the Tudor navy from 1563 to 1596 and rose to the rank of Vice-Admiral. Drake was trained from a young age for a career at sea by his cousin,  fellow Sea Dog Sir John Hawkins. Drake also completed a circumnavigation of the world, which started in 1577 and concluded in 1580. Drake had a huge range of coverage, raiding up the Spanish on the Pacific Coast all the way up to modern day San Francisco. In addition to his commandeering of ships, Drake would sail into ports in the Caribbean to put ransoms on cities, after which he would begin burning the city down until he received payment. Drake was awarded a knighthood in the year of 1581. He later died of dysentery after an unsuccessful attempt to take San Juan, Puerto Rico.

Sir John Hawkins (1532–1595) 

Sir John Hawkins was born into a wealthy family where his father was a sea captain. Hawkins initially sailed with his father on trading trips, but by 1562 he turned to slave trading by using his fleet of three ships led by the "Jesus of Lübeck" to abduct 400 Africans from modern-day Guinea and sell them in the Spanish West Indies. He engaged in slave trading for about five years, making three voyages to Sierra Leone and Guinea and selling 1,200–1,400 enslaved Africans to Spanish colonists in the Americas. He eventually served as Treasurer of the Navy and promoted several reforms. before dying on November 12, 1595.

Sir Walter Raleigh (1552–1618) 

Sir Walter Raleigh was another important Sea Dog. A favourite of the queen, he received a title that allowed him to claim any land that he discovered in the name of England. During an expedition to the New World, he founded the colony of Roanoke which later vanished. Raleigh became infatuated with the idea of a "city of gold" hidden somewhere in South America and set out on an expedition to find it. On his second expedition to find "El Dorado", he ended up in a bit of a predicament after men under his subordinate Lawrence Keymis sacked a Spanish outpost despite England and Spain being at peace. After this incident, Raleigh went back to England. The Spanish were displeased, as they were aware of what Raleigh's men did in violation of the extant peace treaties. As a compromise, Raleigh was executed in the reign of King James I Stuart (1566–1625).

Sir Richard Hawkins (1562–1622)

Sea Dogs and the Spanish Armada 
 

After years of picking off and looting by English Sea Dogs, Philip II of Spain decided that he had had enough. Philip II mobilized an armada of 130 ships to sail into the English Channel and decided to attempt to end English sea-raiding for good. On 28 May 1588, the Armada under the command of Duke of Medina Sidonia set sail for the Netherlands, where it was to pick up additional troops for the invasion of England. As the armada sailed through the English channel, the English navy led by Charles Howard, 1st Earl of Nottingham, and Francis Drake fought a battle of attrition with the Spanish from Plymouth to Portland and then to the Solent, preventing them from securing any English harbours. The Spanish were forced to withdraw to Calais. While the Spanish were at anchor there in a crescent-shaped defensive formation, the English used fireships to break the formation and scatter the Spanish ships. The Spanish ships were bigger and more heavily armed, but the English ships were smaller, faster, and more maneuverable. In the subsequent Battle of Gravelines the English navy inflicted a defeat on the Armada and forced it to sail northward in more dangerous stormy waters on the long way home. As they sailed around Scotland, the Armada suffered severe damage and loss of life from stormy weather. As they approached the West coast of Ireland more damaging stormy conditions forced ships ashore while others were wrecked. Disease took a heavy toll as the fleet finally limped back to port. They ended up retreating after losing more than half of their original ships.

Philip's invasion plans had miscarried partly because of unfortunate weather and his own mismanagement, and partly because the opportunistic defensive naval efforts of the English and their Dutch allies prevailed. The defeat of the Armada provided valuable seafaring experience for English oceanic mariners. While the English were able to persist in their privateering against the Spanish and continue sending troops to assist Philip II's enemies in the Netherlands and France, these efforts brought few tangible rewards. One of the most important effects of the event was that the Armada's failure was seen as a sign that God supported the Protestant Reformation in England. One of the medals struck to celebrate the English victory bore the Latin/Hebrew inscription Flavit יהוה et Dissipati Sunt (literally: "Yahweh blew and they were scattered"; traditionally translated more freely as: "He blew with His winds, and they were scattered".)

An English counter armada under the command of Sir Francis Drake and Sir John Norreys was prepared in 1589 to torch the Spanish Atlantic navy, which was refitting in Santander, Corunna, and San Sebastián in northern Spain. It was also intended to capture the incoming Spanish treasure fleet and expel the Spanish from Portugal (ruled by Philip since 1580) in favour of the Prior of Crato. The English fleet departed from Plymouth on April 13 but was then delayed for nearly two weeks by bad weather. Drake, as a result, had to bypass Santander where the majority of the Spanish fleet were being refitted.

On May 4, the English force eventually arrived at Corunna where the lower town was captured and plundered, and a number of merchant ships were seized. Norreys then won a modest victory over a Spanish relief militia force at Puente del Burgo. When the English pressed the attack on the citadel, however, they were repulsed. In addition, a number of English ships were captured by Spanish naval forces. With the failure to capture Corunna the English departed and headed towards Lisbon, but owing to poor organisation and lack of co-ordination (they had very few siege guns) the invading force also failed to take Lisbon. The expected uprising by the Portuguese loyal to Crato never materialised. With Portuguese and Spanish reinforcements arriving the English retreated and headed North where Drake sacked and burned Vigo. Sickness then struck the expedition, and finally, a portion of the fleet led by Drake headed towards the Azores, which was then scattered in a storm. Drake then took the best part of the fleet and plundered Porto Santo in Madeira before they limped back to Plymouth.

The English Armada was arguably misconceived and ended in failure overall. In the end, Elizabeth sustained a severe loss to her treasury.

References

Further reading
 
 
 Holmes, Richard. The Oxford Companion to Military History. Oxford University Press. 2001. 
 
 

 
Filibusters (military)
Elizabethan era